Cabral Richards, better known as Cabbie, is a Canadian sports television personality who is best known for his time on SportsCentre on TSN, a Canadian sports cable television network.

Broadcasting career 

Originally an intern at The Score, Richards hosted five-minute segments called Cabbie on the Street from 2001 to 2002. After leaving The Score, he joined Sportsnet to produce and host the programs NBAXL and J-Zone, before moving back to The Score in 2005, where he again hosted Cabbie on the Street segments, along with Cabbie Unlimited and Cabbie All Stars. Richards also hosted NBA Court Surfing, before leaving the network again on November 30, 2010. Since 2011, Richards began hosting a weekly segment on TSN's SportsCentre entitled "Cabbie Presents".

Richards was a special correspondent on The Marilyn Denis Show on CTV from 2011 to 2012, where he brought a male perspective to conversations about relationships, while also filing reports with Hollywood actors, musicians and everyday Canadians on the street.

According to Richards, his particular style of journalism – entertain first, inform second – has allowed him to carve out a unique identity. He often initiates physical contact with the people he interviews, a technique that has gotten mixed reactions from interviewees.

His unorthodox and animated style however, has endeared him to many of the A-List athletes he's interviewed. These include stars such as Michael Jordan, Kobe Bryant, Stephen Curry, Aaron Rodgers, Alexander Ovechkin, Derek Jeter and Alex Rodriguez. Richards' atypical interviews with Kobe Bryant have garnered particular attention. Their frequent collaborations had resulted in the two developing a friendly relationship. Richards' interviews have also spanned into the world of entertainment with celebrities such as Will Smith, Hugh Jackman, Will Ferrell, Kevin Hart, Drake, Wiz Khalifa, A$AP Rocky & Kendrick Lamar.

Cabbie Presents 

Richards hosted and produced Cabbie Presents, a weekly segment which aired Fridays on "Sportscentre" on TSN. "Cabbie Presents" offered a light-hearted slice of life look at professional athletes, with a sketch-based format to the segment.

From 2012 to 2019, Richards also hosted a podcast, "Cabbie Presents: The Podcast", where he interviewed a variety of sports and entertainment stars.

Departure from TSN 

Cabbie left TSN on September 6, 2019 to pursue other career aspirations. Thereafter, he began co-hosting Bleacher Report's B/R Betting Show alongside expert Kelly Stewart.

Voice acting

Richards voiced Zeus and Talbot in the video game, Heavy Metal: Geomatrix.

Personal life 

Richards grew up in Toronto, Ontario and attended Galt Collegiate Institute in Cambridge, Ontario. He attended Ryerson University's Radio and Television Art's (RTA) program for three years, leaving before completing his degree.

References

External links
 Cabbie's YouTube channel
 Cabbie's Facebook Fan Page
 
   
 

Black Canadian broadcasters
Canadian people of African-American descent
Canadian radio personalities
Canadian television hosts
Canadian television reporters and correspondents
Canadian television sportscasters
Living people
People from Cambridge, Ontario
Year of birth missing (living people)